Maud High School is a public high school located in the city of Maud, Texas, USA and classified as a 2A school by the UIL. It is a part of the Maud Independent School District located in south central Bowie County. In 2015, the school was rated "Met Standard" by the Texas Education Agency.

Athletics
The Maud Cardinals compete in these sports - 

Baseball
Basketball
Cross Country
Football
Golf
Powerlifting
Softball
Track and Field
Volleyball

State Titles
Baseball  - 
1989(1A)

References

External links
Maud ISD website

Public high schools in Texas
Schools in Bowie County, Texas